Robert Evan Lee Cox (born September 29, 2000), better known by the ring name Evan Golden, is an American professional wrestler. A second generation wrestler, he is the son of Eddie Golden and the third member of the Golden wrestling family.

Early life 
Robert Evan Lee Cox was born on September 29, 2000, in Asheville, North Carolina. His father, Eddie, worked as a professional wrestler, touring the Southeast. Cox attended Asheville-Buncombe Technical Community College.

Professional wrestling career 
Golden debuted on December 18, 2021, for the Asheville-based promotion Uprise Pro Wrestling. Accompanied to the ring by his father Eddie, Golden lost after a rock bottom from Brandon Paradise. On October 22, 2022, Golden defeated Jeff Connelly for the Rocky Top Heavyweight Championship after Connelly issued an open challenge. Golden won the title during a benefit show for Mike Hodge, a local resident awaiting a kidney transplant.

Music career 
On March 19, 2020, Golden debuted his first single as a musician on streaming platforms. Golden released the following single, "Walk", a year later. Golden released his third single titled "Jet Lag" in collaboration with MecHeoN on May 28. Golden released his fourth single titled "Huntin' for Myself" alongside James Tate on July 10, 2021.

Golden released his debut extended play, Creep Tape, on October 17, 2021.

Other media 
Golden will appear in the upcoming Steam game Main Event: Wrestling Manager.

Discography

Extended plays

Singles

As lead artist

References

External links 

 
 
 
 
 

2000 births
Professional wrestlers from North Carolina
Living people
American male professional wrestlers
21st-century professional wrestlers
People from Asheville, North Carolina